Russell Cooper may refer to:

Russell Cooper, Australian politician
Russell W. Cooper, American economist
 Russell K. Cooper, Canadian history advocate, and news photographer